Lists of people who disappeared include those whose current whereabouts are unknown, or whose deaths are unsubstantiated. Many people who disappear are eventually declared dead in absentia. Some of these people were possibly subjected to enforced disappearance, but there is insufficient information on their subsequent fates.

Lists
 List of fugitives from justice who disappeared
 List of kidnappings
 List of missing ships 
 List of missing aircraft 
 List of people who disappeared mysteriously at sea
 List of people who disappeared mysteriously: pre-1910
 List of people who disappeared mysteriously: 1910–1990
 List of people who disappeared mysteriously: 1990–present
 List of solved missing person cases: pre-2000
 List of solved missing person cases: post-2000

See also
 Forced disappearance